Jessica Anderson (born 16 November 1997) is an Australian rules footballer who played for the Melbourne Football Club and Western Bulldogs in the AFL Women's (AFLW).

AFL Women's career

Melbourne
Anderson was drafted by Melbourne with their fourteenth selection and 105th overall in the 2016 AFL Women's draft. She played the first five matches of the season before being omitted for the round six match against  at TIO Stadium in round six. She did not return for the remainder of the season to finish with five matches overall. Anderson was not retained on Melbourne's list at the end of the season and was subsequently delisted in May 2017.

Western Bulldogs
She was delisted by the Western Bulldogs at the end of the 2018 season.

References

External links 

1997 births
Living people
Melbourne Football Club (AFLW) players
Western Bulldogs (AFLW) players
Australian rules footballers from Victoria (Australia)
Melbourne University Football Club (VFLW) players